Arthur Louis Frazier (born January 26, 1965 in St. Louis, Missouri) is a former Major League Baseball outfielder. He played all or part of five seasons in the majors, between 1993 and 1998, for the Montreal Expos, Texas Rangers, and Chicago White Sox. He was primarily a left fielder.

From 2007 to 2008 Frazier was the first base coach for the Pittsburgh Pirates. His duties included working with the Pirates' outfielders and teaching base-running skills. He was fired by the team on September 28, 2008.

References

External links
, or Retrosheet
Pelota Binaria (Venezuelan Winter League)

1965 births
Living people
African-American baseball coaches
African-American baseball players
American expatriate baseball players in Canada
Asheville Tourists players
Baseball players from St. Louis
Bowie Baysox players
Calgary Cannons players
Chicago White Sox players
Columbus Mudcats players
Gulf Coast Astros players
London Tigers players
Major League Baseball left fielders
Montreal Expos players
Navegantes del Magallanes players
American expatriate baseball players in Venezuela
Oklahoma City 89ers players
Osceola Astros players
Ottawa Lynx players
Pittsburgh Pirates coaches
Rochester Red Wings players
Scottsdale Community College alumni
Scranton/Wilkes-Barre Red Barons players
Texas Rangers players
Scottsdale Fighting Artichokes baseball players
21st-century African-American people
20th-century African-American sportspeople